A broad-gauge railway is a railway with a track gauge (the distance between the rails) broader than the  used by standard-gauge railways.

This is the widest gauge in common use anywhere in the world. It is possible for trains on both Iberian gauge and Indian gauge to travel on each other's tracks with no modifications in the vast majority of cases.

History 

In Great Britain, broad gauge was first used in Scotland for the Dundee and Arbroath Railway (1836–1847) and the Arbroath and Forfar Railway (1838–1848). The lines were subsequently converted to standard gauge and connected to the emerging Scottish rail network.

Some harbours also used railways of this gauge for construction and maintenance. These included Portland Harbour and Holyhead Breakwater, which used a locomotive for working sidings. As it was not connected to the national network, this broad-gauge operation continued until the locomotive wore out in 1913. George Stephenson was to add an extra half inch to his original  gauge for the same reason.

Railways which had already received their enabling Act would continue at the 7 ft gauge. Broad-gauge lines in Britain were gradually converted to dual gauge or standard gauge from 1864 and finally the last of Brunel's broad gauge was converted over a weekend in 1892.

In 1839, the Netherlands started its railway system with two broad-gauge railways. But the neighbouring countries Prussia and Belgium already used standard gauge, so the two companies had to regauge their first lines. In 1855, NRS regauged its line and shortly afterwards connected to the Prussian railways. The HSM followed in 1866. There are replicas of one broad-gauge 2-2-2 locomotive (De Arend) and three carriages in the Nederlands Spoorwegmuseum (Dutch Railway Museum) in Utrecht. These replicas were built for the 100th anniversary of the Dutch Railways in 1938–39.

This was later adopted as the standard throughout the country, as it was thought to be safer in areas prone to cyclones and flooding. The  gauge is now commonly referred to as Indian gauge. While some initial freight railway lines in India were built using standard gauge, most of the standard and narrow gauge railways have since been dismantled and relaid in broad gauge.

Ireland and some states in Australia and Brazil have a gauge of  but Luas, the Dublin light rail system, is built to standard gauge. Portugal and the Spanish Renfe system use a gauge of  called Ancho Ibérico in Spanish or Bitola Ibérica in Portuguese (see Iberian gauge); though there are plans to convert to standard gauge.

In Toronto, Canada, the gauge for TTC subways and streetcars was chosen in 1861. The Toronto Transit Commission still operates the Toronto streetcar system and three heavy-rail subway lines using this unique gauge. The light metro Scarborough RT and two light rail lines under construction (Eglinton Crosstown line and Finch West) use standard gauge.

In 1851, the  broad gauge was officially adopted as the standard gauge for the Province of Canada, becoming known as the Provincial gauge and government subsidies were unavailable for railways that chose other gauges. This caused problems in interchanging freight cars with northern United States railroads, most of which were built to standard gauge or a gauge similar to it. In the 1870s (mainly between 1872 and 1874), Canadian broad-gauge lines were changed to standard gauge to facilitate interchange and the exchange of rolling stock with American railroads. Today, all Canadian railways are standard-gauge.

In the early days of rail transport in the US, railways tended to be built out from coastal cities into the hinterland, and systems did not initially connect. Each builder was free to choose its own gauge, although the availability of British-built locomotives encouraged some railways to be built to standard gauge. As a general rule, southern railways were built to one or another broad gauge, mostly , while northern railroads that were not standard gauge tended to be narrow gauge. In 1848, Ohio passed a law stating "The width of the track or gauge of all roads under this act, shall be four feet ten inches between the rails." When American railroads' track extended to the point that they began to interconnect, it became clear that a single nationwide gauge was desirable.

Six-foot-gauge railroads had developed a large regional following in New York State in the first part of the 19th century, due to the influence of the New York and Erie, one of the early pioneering railroads in America, chartered in 1832, with its first section opening in 1841. The builders and promoters decided that a six-foot track gauge would be needed for locomotives to be larger and more powerful than were in general use at the time, for pulling very large trains. Building westward from the Hudson River, it eventually reached Lake Erie, establishing a mainline longer than  providing a shortcut to the American Midwest region from the New York City vicinity, and helping spawn a regional network of six-foot-gauge railroads almost exclusively within New York State.

Many early New York railways were Erie railroad-built branch lines, while others were independent railroads that wanted to partner and interchange with the Erie. These included the Walkill Valley, the Albany and Susquehanna (later part of the Delaware and Hudson); the Elmira, Jefferson & Canandaigua (later the Northern Central, becoming part of the Pennsylvania Railroad); the Delaware, Lackawanna and Western mainline (which also had a significant amount of trackage in Pennsylvania); predecessor lines of the New York and Oswego Midland (later the New York, Ontario, and Western); and the Canandaigua and Niagara Falls (later becoming part of the New York Central railroad's Peanut Route along the shoreline of Lake Ontario). However, by the late 1870s, the trend was inevitable, and conversion to standard gauge began, some lines first becoming "dual gauged" with the addition of a third running rail. Between 1876 and 1880, most of the remaining six-foot gauge trackage was converted.

In 1886, the railways in the Southern United States agreed to coordinate changing gauge on all their tracks. After considerable debate and planning, most of the southern rail network was converted from  gauge to  gauge, nearly the standard of the Pennsylvania Railroad, over two days beginning on 31 May 1886. The new gauge was close enough that standard-gauge equipment could run on it without difficulty. By June 1886, all major railroads in North America were using approximately the same gauge. The final conversion to true standard gauge took place gradually as track was maintained.

Some North American tram (streetcar) lines intentionally deviated from standard gauge. This may have been to make the tram companies less tempting targets for takeovers by the steam railways (or competing tram companies), which would be unable to run their trains over the tram tracks.

This gauge was also used for the now defunct Pittsburgh Railways, West Penn Railways, and trams in Cincinnati. Similar  gauge is used in Philadelphia on the SEPTA routes, 15, 101 and 102, the Subway–Surface Trolleys and the SEPTA Market-Frankford. Bay Area Rapid Transit (BART) system in the San Francisco Bay Area was opened in 1972 with  gauge, and thus requires all related equipment to be custom built. The system trackage has been extended multiple times since then, and new railcars have been ordered with this non-standard gauge.

The use of a non-standard gauge precludes interoperability of rolling stock on railway networks. On the British Great Western Railway the  gauge was supposed to allow high speed, but the company had difficulty with locomotive design in the early years, losing much of the advantage, and rapid advances in permanent way and suspension technology allowed standard-gauge speeds to approach broad-gauge speeds within a decade or two. In the end, the most powerful engines on standard gauge in North America and Scandinavia far exceeded the power of any early broad-gauge locomotive, but then met limits set by other factors such as the capacity of manual stoking, the axle (and total) locomotive weight that would trigger upgrades to the rails and bridges, the maximum wheelbase and/or boiler length compatible with an individual route's curves.

High Speed Rail 
The country is planning to build its portion of the Beijing to Moscow high speed railway in broad gauge.

South Asia primarily uses the broad gauge for its passenger rail services and the fastest broad gauge train presently in the region is the Indian Railways' Vande Bharat Express (a.k.a. Train 18). The sustained speeds of this train is considerably lower, with a peak operational speed of 130 km/h and an average speed of 95 km/h, due to track limitations. Indian Railways has plans to introduce a higher speed Train 20 that is capable of 200 km/h, but the project has encountered delays stemming from bids for rolling-stocks with poor local sourcing. A number of semi high speed railway projects using broad gauge tracks are being planned or built in the region, with sustained speeds of 200 km/h with future-proofing for 250 km/h. India's current high speed railway project is being built on the standard gauge due to limitations imposed by the Japanese consortium funding the project, however the feasibility reports by both the French and German consultants preferred a broad gauge high speed railway. These European reports stated that the additional costs of train procurement, due to the essential modifications of the rolling-stock for the broad gauge, from European rolling-stock manufacturers such as Alstom or Siemens would be softened through a large minimum order size of at least thirty train sets. A considerable debate has continued about the suitability of the high speed rail on standard gauge for the Indian travel demands and the possible exclusion of the existing rail network in India. The recent discussions around the Kerala semi-high speed rail has highlighted the limitations of high speed rail on broad gauge. Since most of the global high speed rail infrastructure is built using the standard gauge, the cost benefits of using off-the-shelf rolling-stocks with minimal customizations and the availability of extensive, well proven technical know-how, are significant factors in favor of the high speed rail on the standard gauge over the broad gauge, for cost sensitive rail markets in South Asia, especially in India.

Gauges

4 ft  in gauge 

This gauge is used by the Toronto streetcar system and the Toronto subway

5 ft and 1520 mm gauge 

This gauge was first used in the United Kingdom and the United States before it became the standard gauge for most railways in the former Soviet Union.

Russian gauge or CIS gauge  is the second most widely used gauge in the world, and spans the whole of the former Soviet Union/CIS bloc including the Baltic states and Mongolia. Finland uses . The difference is clearly lower than the tolerance margin, so through running is feasible. Care must be taken when servicing international trains because the wear profile of the wheels differs from that of trains that run on domestic tracks only.

When the Finnish rail network was founded in 1862, Finland was the Grand Duchy of Finland, a region of Imperial Russia. In Russia, this gauge was re-standardized to  during the 1960s. Finland retained the original gauge with no re-standardisation.

5 ft 3 in gauge 

As part of the railway gauge standardisation considered by the United Kingdom Parliamentary Gauge Commission, Ireland was allocated its own gauge, Irish gauge. Ireland then had three gauges, and the new standard would be a fourth.  

A problem with the Irish Gauge in Australia is that it is only  wider than the standard gauge used in other parts of Australia, principally New South Wales. Therefore, it is not considered advisable to use a third rail to allow dual-gauge operation on mainline sections of track, because of the danger of material lodging between the two rails.
There has been argument for well over a century about the practicability of third rail operation, and numerous devices have been promoted to overcome the problem, especially at turnouts, including the "Brennan Switch".

5 ft  in 

This gauge was once used by the United Railways and Electric Company and the MTA Maryland and is now used only by the Baltimore Streetcar Museum.

Iberian gauge 

The main railway networks of Spain were initially constructed to a  gauge of six Castilian feet. Those of Portugal were initially built in standard gauge, but by 1864 were all converted to a  gauge of five Portuguese feet – close enough to allow interoperability in practice. The new high-speed network in Spain and Portugal uses standard gauge. The dual-gauge high-speed train RENFE Class 130 can change gauge at low speed without stopping.

5 ft 6 in gauge 

The  gauge was first used in Great Britain in Scotland for two short, isolated lines, the Dundee and Arbroath Railway (1836-1847) and the Arbroath and Forfar Railway (1838- ). Both the lines were subsequently converted to standard gauge and connected to the Scottish rail network.

Later this gauge was adopted as a standard for many British colonies such as Province of Canada and British India.

In 1851, the  broad gauge was officially adopted as the standard gauge for the Province of Canada, becoming known as the Provincial gauge, and government subsidies were unavailable for railways that chose other gauges. In the 1870s, mainly between 1872 and 1874, Canadian broad-gauge lines were changed to standard gauge to facilitate interchange and the exchange of rolling stock with American railways. Today, all Canadian railways are standard-gauge.

In US, this gauge was adopted for many lines, but soon fell out in favour of standard gauge. Today, only California's Bay Area Rapid Transit (BART) uses this gauge.

In British India, some standard gauge freight railways were built in initial period, though they were dismantled later. Attempts to economize on the cost of construction led to the adoption of  gauge and then  and  narrow gauges for many secondary and branch lines. In the later part of the 20th century, due to interchangeability and maintenance issue, the railways in each of the countries in the Indian Subcontinent began to convert all metre-gauge and narrow-gauge lines to this gauge. Today, the nationwide rail network in Pakistan, Sri Lanka and Nepal is entirely on this gauge, whereas India, under Project Unigauge, and Bangladesh are still undergoing gauge conversion.

This gauge is the widest gauge in regular passenger use in the world.

Broader gauges 
Some industrial uses require still broader gauges, such as:

 Large telescopes and telescope arrays.
 Launch pads – The European Space Agency, Roscosmos, NASA and SpaceX use double-track railway to move rockets and supporting equipment at launch sites (with exceptions such as the rocket launches from Kennedy Space Center, which use caterpillar tracks on a river stone roadbed because other solutions cannot support the loads required).
 Gantry crane for unloading cargo from ships, loading cargo onto ships and for constructing ships.
 Funiculars, Incline elevator and Canal inclined plane, for transportation on sloped way.

Gallery 

These applications might use double track of the country's usual gauge to provide the necessary stability and axle load. Vehicles on these gauges generally operate at very low speeds.

Future proposals

Argentina-India broad-gauge link
Routes: India - Pakistan - Afghanistan - Central Asian Republics - Russia - North America - Andes Mountains - Bolivia - Argentina with several branches
Track gauge: 
Electrification: 25kV 50/60 Hz AC and 50kV 50/60 Hz AC overhead lines
Minimum track center spacing: 

Resurrection of Brunel's broad-gauge railways

Routes:
Russia - Belarus - Poland - Germany - France
Russia - Ukraine - Poland - Germany - Netherlands - Britain
Russia - Central Asian Republics
Russia - North America
Russia - Finland - Sweden - Denmark - Germany
Denmark - Britain
Track gauge: 
Electrification: 50kV 50/60 Hz AC overhead lines
Minimum track center spacing: 

Cultural references

A P. G. Wodehouse character, Roderick Spode, suggests widening the rails of the entire British railway network so sheep may stand sideways on trains.

See also 

Breitspurbahn
List of track gauges
List of tram systems by gauge and electrification
Ramsey car-transfer apparatus
Track gauge

References

External links 
 Broad Gauge Society
 Brunel's Broad Gauge Railways
 Jane's World Railways (hard copy)
 
 Brunel portal

Track gauges by size